is a Japanese idol singer, actress and a former member of the Japanese idol girl group Nogizaka46. She was also the captain of the group before her departure.

Career

In 2011, Sakurai auditioned for Nogizaka46 and was chosen as one of the first generation members.
Her audition song was Happiness's "Kiss Me". She was chosen as one of the members performing on their debut single "Guruguru Curtain", released on February 22, 2012. She took the front position for Nogizaka46's second single "Oide Shampoo", released on May 2, 2012. In June 2012, she was appointed the captain of Nogizaka46. After graduating from high school, she studied sociology at college. In April 2013, she regularly appeared on the television drama Bad Boys J with other Nogizaka46 members.

From October 25 to November 9, 2014, she played the heroine in the musical Mr. Kaminari, alongside former Nogizaka46 bandmate Misa Etō. In 2016, she was cast as the leading role in Kiraware Matsuko no Isshō, a stage adaptation of the film Memories of Matsuko. Former Nogizaka46 bandmate Yumi Wakatsuki also played the same role. In February 2017, she shot herself to promote her photo book titled Jiyu to Iu Koto which was released on March 8, 2017.

On July 8, 2019, Sakurai announced that she would be graduating from Nogizaka46 on September 1, 2019, timing her graduation to coincide with the final stop of the group's national summer tour.

On March 1, 2021, she has opened an official web site and fun club.

Discography

Singles with Nogizaka46

Albums with Nogizaka46

Other featured songs

Filmography

Television

Films

Theater

Bibliography

Photobooks
 Kikan Nogizaka vol.1 Sōshun (5 March 2014, Tokyo News Service) 
 Jiyuu to Iu Koto (6 March 2017, Kobunsha) 
 Shisen (27 November 2019, Kobunsha)

References

External links 
  
 
  

Nogizaka46 members
1994 births
Living people
Japanese idols
J-pop singers
Musicians from Kanagawa Prefecture
21st-century Japanese singers
21st-century Japanese women singers
Japanese television actresses
Japanese film actresses